"Dark Clouds" is a song by American rapper Rod Wave, released on November 21, 2019 by Alamo Records. It is the lead single from his second studio album Pray 4 Love (2019).

Composition
The song finds Rod Wave soulfully singing about the dark times in his life, such as overcoming his pain and his depression and isolation, as well as dealing with his newfound fame and love for his family. It has been described as a trap ballad.

Music video
A music video for the song was released. It features clips of Rod Wave in the studio, with rappers Meek Mill and Calboy in sessions, performing the opening act for Kevin Gates' I'm Him Tour, and posing with his grandmother.

Charts

Certifications

References

2019 singles
2019 songs
Rod Wave songs
Songs written by Rod Wave